Matej Král (born 28 December 1990) is a Slovak football midfielder who currently plays for FC Nitra.

References

External links
 
  at fcnitra.sk 

1990 births
Living people
Slovak footballers
Association football midfielders
FC Nitra players
Slovak Super Liga players
Sportspeople from Nitra